Bogdana Trifković is a Bosnian beauty pageant titleholder who was crowned as Miss Earth BiH 2014.

Pageantry

Miss Earth BiH 2014
She won the title of "Miss Earth BiH" for 2014. The pageant was held on September 19, 2014.

Miss Earth 2014

By winning Miss Earth BiH, Bogdana flew to the Philippines in November to compete with almost 100 other candidates to be Alyz Henrich's successor as Miss Earth.

As a Miss Earth delegate, an environmental advocacy is must. When she was asked about her advocacy for the pageant, she answered, "I think we should save nature and all the natural resources.  It is very important to save water and forests. Water is the thing without which no life, and the forests can survive. As soon as you disturb nature or disrupt the ozone layer it affect our lives." 

When asked about what she can promote about her country, Bogdana replied about Bosnia and Herzegovina's 'turbulent history". She added something by saying, "When you arrive in Sarajevo, Bosnia heart can not bypass the Old Town, where he generally took the whole city to be developed. There you can taste all the traditional dishes of Bosnia and Herzegovina. Also in Bosnia there is a lot of construction from the time Austor-Hungarians authorities."

At the conclusion of the pageant, she failed to enter the semifinal round. The Miss Earth 2014 title was won by Jamie Herrell of the Philippines.

References

External links
Bogdana at Miss Earth official website
Miss Earth Bosnia and Herzegovina official website

Miss Earth 2014 contestants
Bosnia and Herzegovina female models
Living people
1995 births
Serbs of Bosnia and Herzegovina
Serbian female models
Serb models